The Hungry Brain: Outsmarting the Instincts That Make Us Overeat is a 2017 non-fiction book by Stephan J. Guyenet. Guyenet describes the mechanisms by which the brain regulates diet.

Reviews
Publishers Weekly called it "insightful and important". Kirkus Reviews called it "a helpful guide offering encouragement to those looking for ways to lead healthier lives". A review published by the British Association for Psychopharmacology called it "an excellent, timely and very important book". It was also reviewed by The New York Times.

References

2017 non-fiction books
Flatiron Books books